Leonardo Moreira Morais (born 3 October 1991 in Salvador), commonly known as Léo is a Brazilian professional footballer who plays as a right back for Botafogo-PA.

Career

Vitória

Atlético Paranaense
On 8 February 2013 Atlético Paranaense signed Léo Morais on loan from Vitória until the end of the 2013 season. He quickly became a first team starter and was one of the most important players in the 2013 Copa do Brasil campaign, in which Atlético reached the finals only losing to Flamengo in two matches.

Flamengo
After a great 2013 season with Atlético Paranaense Flamengo signed Léo Morais on 2 January 2 2014, from Vitória, to play as back-up right back for Léo Moura. Léo struggled with a series of injuries and never stablished himself as a regular player on Flamengo's roster.

Internacional (loan)

Second loan to Atlético Paranaense
On 17 January 2017 Atlético Paranaense extended Léo Morais until the end of 2017 season. Although, the player was released from the club in May 2017 due to problems with the club officers.

Coritiba (loan)
After having his loan contract cancelled with Atlético Paranaense, rivals Coritiba signed Léo Morais on loan from Flamengo on 9 May 2017 until the end of 2017 season.

Fluminense (loan)
As Léo Morais would not have space in Flamengo's first team on 23 January 2018 Fluminense signed him on loan until 31 December 2018.

Career statistics
(Correct )

Honours
Vitória
Campeonato Baiano: 2010

Flamengo
Campeonato Carioca: 2014

Internacional
Campeonato Gaúcho: 2015

Atlético Paranaense
Campeonato Paranaense: 2016, 2017

References

External links

1991 births
Living people
Brazilian footballers
Campeonato Brasileiro Série A players
Esporte Clube Vitória players
Club Athletico Paranaense players
CR Flamengo footballers
Sport Club Internacional players
Coritiba Foot Ball Club players
Fluminense FC players
Avaí FC players
Association football defenders
Sportspeople from Salvador, Bahia